Jalan M.H. Thamrin or Jalan Thamrin (M.H. Thamrin Road or Thamrin Road) is a major thoroughfare in Jakarta, Indonesia. The road is located at the center of Jakarta, running from the north end of Jalan Jenderal Sudirman at West Flood Canal at the south end to the roundabout near Arjuna Wijaya Statue Jakarta at the north end. Developed in the 1950s, the road was a landmark of post-colonial Indonesia and continues to have a prominent importance in Jakarta.

Description
Thamrin Road is classified as a secondary arterial road in Jakarta. 

The road passes through five urban administrative villages:
Gambir, Gambir, Central Jakarta
Kebon Sirih, Menteng, Central Jakarta
Gondangdia, Menteng, Central Jakarta
Menteng, Menteng, Central Jakarta
Kebon Melati, Tanah Abang, Central Jakarta

Thamrin Road is closed to traffic every Sunday from 6:00 until 11:00 as part of Jakarta Car Free Days campaign. The Thamrin road is one of the Odd–even Traffic Restriction Scheme implementation zones (Monday to Friday, 06:00-10:00 and 16:00-21:00)

History

Before Thamrin Road
The road that would become Thamrin Road first appear around late 1910s-1920s as a small lane running from Koningsplein West (now Medan Merdeka Barat) to Kebon Sirih. This lane was known as Gang Timboel. Prominent landmark near this small lane was a 19th-century Armenian Church for the Armenian community of Batavia. The church has been demolished. The former location of the Armenian Church is the green within the complex of Bank Indonesia.

1950s Kebayoran Baru
The development of the suburb Kebayoran in 1949 raised the need to link the suburb with the city center of Jakarta, and thus work on a new "highway" began in the same year. The northern half of this new highway received the name Jalan M.H. Thamrin by January 1951, after Indonesian National Hero Mohammad Husni Thamrin. To avoid the occupation of the newly opened lands by illegal squatters - a major problem at the time - the government sold these lands cheaply to those who committed to build on it within three to six months. Despite this, time extensions had to be granted because buyers could not arrange finance or procure building materials. 

Among the early projects situated in Thamrin Road were Sarinah Department Store, Bank Dagang Negara building (now Wisma Mandiri), Ministry of Religion building, Wisma Nusantara, Hotel Indonesia and the prominent Bundaran Hotel Indonesia. Thamrin Road was largely completed by 1953.

1962 Asian Games expansion
 
With the arrival of the 1962 Asian Games, President Sukarno imagined the VIP visitors for the Asian Games arriving at Kemayoran Airport, drove along Thamrin Road, be greeted by the Welcome Monument and stayed at Hotel Indonesia. For the Games itself, the same VIP visitors would be driven along Sudirman Road over the Semanggi cloverleaf bridge into the newly-opened Gelora Bung Karno sports complex where the competitions would take place. For the purpose of the game, both Thamrin and Sudirman Road were widened in the early 1960s. A regulation was also established which requires buildings along Thamrin Road to be minimum five-stories-high. This was difficult to achieve due to lack of funding and commercial building expertise at that time, and the fact that there were already several two-story government buildings along Thamrin Road.

In the beginning of 1970s, Thamrin Road was already a major thoroughfare of Jakarta as envisaged by Sukarno. Buildings reached a minimum height of five stories e.g. ICA building (later the United Nations), Hotel Asoka, the Australian Embassy, and the state-owned developer Pembangunan Perumahan. Sudirman Road was still relatively devoid of development during the early 1970s compare with Thamrin Road, with the exception of the Gelora Bung Karno Sports Complex. 

Several parades were enacted along the major thoroughfare, including Jakarta's anniversary parade and Independence Day parade.

TransJakarta

Up until the 2000s, Thamrin Road consisted of four carriageways consisting of local-express lanes, 3 lanes for the express lane and 2 lanes for the local lane. With the introduction of TransJakarta BRT in 2004, one of the lane of the express lanes was converted into a dedicated lane for the BRT. Eventually, Thamrin Road was made a dual carriageway by removing the separator of the local and express lanes.

Motorcycle
The Jakarta administration in December 2014 introduced a ban on motorcycles from using Jalan Thamrin and the adjoining Jalan Medan Merdeka Barat.

The ban was lifted by governor Anies Baswedan in 2018.

Major buildings along the MH Thamrin Road

Intersections 
There are four intersections:

 Bank Indonesia Fountain Roundabout, to West Medan Merdeka Street (north), Budi Kemuliaan Street (west), and South Medan Merdeka Street (east)
 Kebon Sirih Street intersection
 Kyai Haji Wahid Hasyim Street Intersection
 Hotel Indonesia Roundabout, to Jalan Jenderal Sudirman (south) and Menteng (southeast)

Transportation

Sudirman station of KRL Commuterline and BNI City station of Soekarno–Hatta Airport Rail Link are located at the south end of the road as a part of Dukuh Atas TOD.

Bus routes

TransJakarta 

There are four stops for the TransJakarta busway along Jalan M.H. Thamrin, mainly serving for Route 1, 6A, and 6B. They are:
 Tosari, close to Grand Indonesia Shopping Town, in front of UOB Plaza and The City Tower.
 M.H. Thamrin, in front of Sarinah, General Election Supervisory Agency (Badan Pengawas Pemilihan Umum) and Menara Eksekutif.
 Bank Indonesia, in front of Bank Indonesia (north) and near Wisma Mandiri (south).
 Bundaran Hotel Indonesia, in front of Bundaran HI with a passageway linking the stop with Bundaran HI MRT Station.

The Transjakarta routes that serves the M.H. Thamrin Road are:

 BRT Corridors
  Blok M-Kota
  Kalideres–Bundaran HI (temporary)
  Ragunan-M.H. Thamrin via Kuningan
  Ragunan-M.H. Thamrin via Semanggi
  Pinang Ranti-Kota
 Inner city feeder
 1P Senen–Blok M
 9D Pasar Minggu–Tanah Abang
 Dukuh Atas TOD connection route
 DA4 Dukuh Atas–Kota
 RoyalTrans
 1T Cibubur Junction–Kota
 Free buses
 GR1 Bundaran Senayan–Harmoni
 #jakartaexplorer tour buses
 BW2 (Jakarta Modern) 
 BW3 (Art and culinary)
 BW4 (Jakarta skyscrapers)
 BW5 (Jakarta open space)
 BW6 (Jakarta Heritage)
 BW7 (Jakarta Shopping)

Other buses 
Apart from Transjakarta, here are the list of public transportation routes that serve the M.H. Thamrin Road:
 Metromini S640 Pasar Minggu-Tanah Abang
 Metromini P15 Senen-Setiabudi
 Kopaja P19 Tanah Abang-Ragunan
 Kopaja S602 AC Monas-Ragunan
 PPD AC11 Pulo Gadung-Grogol
 PPD AC16 Lebak Bulus-Rawamangun
 PPD P67 Blok M-Senen
 PPD 213 Grogol-Kampung Melayu
 Mayasari Bakti AC52 Tanah Abang-Bekasi (via Komdak - Sudirman - Thamrin - Bulak Kapal)
 Mayasari Bakti AC52A Tanah Abang-Jatiasih (via Komdak - Sudirman - Thamrin - Jatibening)
 Mayasari Bakti AC62 Senen-Poris Plawad (via Slipi - Sudirman - Thamrin - Karawaci)
 Mayasari Bakti AC70 Tanah Abang-Kp. Rambutan (via Komdak - Sudirman - Thamrin - UKI - Ps. Rebo)
 Mayasari Bakti AC70A Tanah Abang-Cileungsi (via Komdak - Sudirman - Thamrin - Cibubur)
 Bianglala Metropolitan AC44 Senen-Ciledug (via Stasiun Gambir - Sudirman - Thamrin - Kebayoran Lama)
 Bianglala Metropolitan AC57 Harmoni-Ciputat (via Sudirman - Thamrin - Fatmawati - Lebak Bulus)
 Bianglala Metropolitan AC76 Senen-Ciputat (via Sudirman - Thamrin - Fatmawati - Lebak Bulus)
 Jasa Utama P125 Blok M-Tanjung Priok (via Sudirman - Thamrin - Ps. Baru)

Train lines

Jakarta MRT 
The M.H. Thamrin Road is also served by the North–South Line of the Jakarta MRT  There are two stations:

 Bundaran HI, near Plaza Indonesia, Pullman Hotel, Wisma Nusantara and Selamat Datang Monument
 Thamrin (under construction), near BPPT, Bank Indonesia Head Office, the Ministry of Religious Affairs, Indosurya Finance Center, Wisma Mandiri, and Bangkok Bank

KRL Commuterline 

This road is also accessible with the Cikarang Loop Line of the KRL Commuterline  There is one station:

 Sudirman Station

Airport Railink 

M.H. Thamrin Road is also served by the Soekarno–Hatta Airport Rail Link  There is one station:

 BNI City Station

See also
History of Jakarta
Sarinah
Mohammad Husni Thamrin

Notes

References

Works cited

Berkmoes, R.V. et al. ¨Indonesia¨. Lonely Planet, 2010.

Roads of Jakarta
Central Jakarta
Central business districts in Indonesia
Shopping districts and streets in Indonesia